The Margaret Catchpole is a pub in Cliff Lane, Ipswich, named after Margaret Catchpole, a servant of Elizabeth and John Cobbold of the Tolly Cobbold brewery. Built in 1936 by the local architect Harold Ridley Hooper for the Cobbold brewery, it is a Grade II* listed building. Most of its interior features have remained unaltered since the 1930s, making it one of the finest examples of this period in England. Since 2003 it has been part of the Holywells Park Conservation Area.

Margaret Catchpole

The building was named after Margaret Catchpole, previously a servant of the writer Elizabeth Cobbold. After providing good service to the Cobbold's, she left their employ. However, in 1797 she stole a horse from them to ride to London to find her lover. She was arrested and after being found guilty in a trial she was sentenced to death, subsequently commuted to transportation to Australia. Her story was subsequently turned into a novel by Elizabeth's son, Richard Cobbold, in 1845 and has remained popular ever since.

References

Grade II* listed buildings in Ipswich
Pubs in Ipswich
Cobbold pubs
Grade II* listed pubs in Suffolk